Gadoi, or Gadong, is a town in the Bainang County, Shigatse City, Tibet Autonomous Region of China. , it had 14 villages under its administration.

References

External links

Populated places in Shigatse
Township-level divisions of Tibet